is a former Japanese footballer who last played and captained Grulla Morioka.

Career
After a decade spent with Grulla Morioka, Matsuda opted to retire after playing one game in the whole 2016 season. He's now still part of the club, helping Grulla and the region of Iwate getting known in Japan.

Career statistics
Updated to 23 February 2017.

References

External links

Profile at Grulla Morioka

1984 births
Living people
Hachinohe Gakuin University alumni
Association football people from Iwate Prefecture
Japanese footballers
J3 League players
Iwate Grulla Morioka players
Association football midfielders